Uzmi ili ostavi may refer to:
Uzmi ili ostavi (Serbia), Serbian version of Deal or No Deal
Uzmi ili ostavi (Croatia), Croatian version of Deal or No Deal